The Selangau District is a district in Sarawak, Malaysia.

History
Selangau was declared a district on 1 March 2002.

Demographics
According to the Department of Statistics Malaysia, Selangau has a population of 26,100.

References